Oviedo is a city and municipality in the Pedernales province of the Dominican Republic. It is the southernmost city of the Dominican Republic and of the Hispaniola island.

Climate

Sources 
 – World-Gazetteer.com

References 

Populated places in Pedernales Province
Municipalities of the Dominican Republic